Executive Order is a 2020 Brazilian dystopian drama film directed by Lázaro Ramos (in his feature directorial debut), based on the stage play Namibia, no! by Aldri Anunciação.

The film had its world premiere at the Moscow International Film Festival on 3 October 2020, and was screened at the Indie Memphis Film Fest on 20 October 2020 and at the South by Southwest Film Festival on 20 March 2021. It was released theatrically in Brazil on 14 April 2022.

Plot
Near future in Brazil. After Capitú, a doctor, and Antônio, a lawyer, sue the authoritarian Brazilian government for compensation for the descendants of African slaves once brought to the country, they and all other Black citizens are to be sent to Africa. This outrageous order is followed by a hunt for Black citizens who are exiled to Africa against their will.

While the army and the police enforce the law, Antonio sends his uncle to go in search of the doctor, who has joined a resistance movement. From the background and underground, they fight together against the madness that has spread in the country, triggering a resistance that inspires the nation.

Cast

Soundtrack

References

External links
 

2020 films
2020 directorial debut films
2020 science fiction films
2020 thriller drama films
2020s dystopian films
2020s Portuguese-language films
2020s science fiction drama films
2020s science fiction thriller films
Brazilian films based on plays
Brazilian science fiction drama films
Brazilian science fiction thriller films
Brazilian thriller drama films
Films about racism
Films set in the future